Kirsten Jane Bishop is an Australian writer and artist. In 2004, her first book, The Etched City, was nominated for a World Fantasy Award for Best Novel. She is a recipient of the Aurealis Award for best collection.

Bibliography

Novels
 The Etched City (2003)

Collections
 That Book Your Mad Ancestor Wrote (e-book publication in 2012)

Short fiction
 "The Art of Dying" (1997)
 "The Love of Beauty" (1999)
 "The Memorial Page" (2002)
 "On the Origins of the Fragrant Hill" (2002)
 "Beach Rubble" (2003)
 "Maldoror Abroad" (2003)
 "Reminiscence" (The Thackery T Lambshead Pocket Guide to Eccentric & Discredited Diseases, 2003)
 "Alsiso" (The Alsiso Project, 2004)
 "We the Enclosed" (2004)
 "Vision Splendid", in Baggage (published by Eneit Press run by Sharyn Lilley)(2010)

Awards
2004  	William L. Crawford Award for Best First Novel
2004 	Ditmar Award for Best Novel
2004 	Ditmar Award for Best New Talent

References

External links

Interview by Jeff VanderMeer for Clarkesworld Magazine (April, 2008)
Interview by Jay Tomio (April, 2003)

Living people
Australian fantasy writers
Australian women novelists
Australian women short story writers
Women science fiction and fantasy writers
20th-century Australian women writers
21st-century Australian women writers
20th-century Australian short story writers
21st-century Australian short story writers
Year of birth missing (living people)
Weird fiction writers